Koto (hiragana: , katakana: ヿ) is one of the Japanese kana. It is a polysyllabic kana which represents two morae. Both the hiragana and katakana forms represent .   is a combination (ligature) of the hiragana graphs of ko (こ) and to (と), while ヿ originates from the Chinese character 事.

In Unicode

See also

 Ko (kana)
 To (kana)
 Yori (kana)
 Katakana

Specific kana